is a Shinto shrine in the Kawai-cho neighborhood of the city of  Ōda in Shimane Prefecture, Japan. It is the ichinomiya of former Iwami Province. The main festivals of the shrine are held annually on January 7 and on November 24.

Enshrined kami
The kami enshrined at Mononobe Jinja are:
 , the founder of the Mononobe clan and god of rituals
 , the father of Umashimazu
 , a spirit sword
 , one of the godson creation
 , the Sun goddess

History
The origins of Mononobe Jinja are unknown. According to the shrine's legend, Umashimaji, the son of Nigihayahi, helped Emperor Jimmu's conquest of Yamato, and then led his clan to settle in Mino and Koshi Province, eventually dying in Iwami. He was buried in a kofun on Mount Yaoyama, behind the current shrine, and in 514, Emperor Keitai ordered that a shrine be built at the southern foot of the mountain. It first appears in the historical record in 869 AD, and the Engishiki records from the early Heian period list it as only a small shrine. However, it was regarded as the ichinomiya of the province from this time. The hereditary kannushi of this shrine, the Kaneko family, were one of only 14 priestly families to hold a noble title and held the rank of danshaku (baron) under the kazoku peerage. 

During the Meiji period era of State Shinto, the shrine was rated as a  under the Modern system of ranked Shinto Shrines.

The shrine is located ten-minutes by car from Ōdashi Station on the JR West Sanin Main Line

Cultural Properties
Tachi, Japanese sword, Kamakura period, signed "Ryokai", who was a master of the Yamashiro school. The sword has a length of 64.5 cm, and was donated to the shrine by Ōuchi Yoshitaka in 1542

Gallery

See also
List of Shinto shrines
Ichinomiya

References
 Plutschow, Herbe. Matsuri: The Festivals of Japan. RoutledgeCurzon (1996) 
 Ponsonby-Fane, Richard Arthur Brabazon. (1959).  The Imperial House of Japan. Kyoto: Ponsonby Memorial Society. OCLC 194887

External links

 Official homepage 
Shimane Official Tourist Information

Notes

Shinto shrines in Shimane Prefecture
Iwami Province
Ichinomiya